Eritreum melakeghebrekristosi is an extinct species of proboscidean mammal, which lived in Northeast Africa during the late Oligocene some 27 million years ago, and is considered to be the missing link between modern elephants and their ancestors. The fossils of this species are the oldest known fossils featuring the horizontal tooth displacement seen in modern elephants.

The generic name Eritreum comes from Eritrea, the country in the Horn of Africa where the specimen was discovered. The specific name melakeghebrekristosi honors Melake Ghebrekristos, the farmer who found the specimen.

References

 

Elephantiformes
Oligocene proboscideans
Prehistoric placental genera
Oligocene mammals of Africa
Fossil taxa described in 2006
Taxa named by Michael Abraha